Donnie Ray Humphrey (April 20, 1961 – September 1, 2014) was a former nose tackle and defensive end in the National Football League.

Biography
Humphrey was born Donnie Ray Humphrey on April 20, 1961 in Huntsville, Alabama. He played high school football at J.O. Johnson High School in Huntsville, Alabama. He is the father of WNBA player Tasha Humphrey. He died on September 1, 2014 at his Yucca Valley, California home after an unspecified brief illness.

Career
Humphrey was drafted in the third round of the 1984 NFL Draft by the Green Bay Packers and played with the team for three seasons. In college, he was an All-American defensive lineman at Auburn University, playing there from 1979-1983.

See also
List of Green Bay Packers players

References

1961 births
2014 deaths
Sportspeople from Huntsville, Alabama
Players of American football from Alabama
Green Bay Packers players
American football defensive tackles
American football defensive ends
Auburn Tigers football players